Anne Cornwall (January 17, 1897 – March 2, 1980) was an American actress best known for her roles in College (1927) and The Roughneck (1924).

Biography
Born in Brooklyn in 1897, Cornwall performed for forty years in many silent film productions starting in 1918, and later in talkies, until 1959. She was first married to writer/director Charles Maigne, then later to Los Angeles engineer Ellis Wing Taylor, who fathered her only child, Peter Taylor. In  1925 she was one of the WAMPAS Baby Stars. Cornwall passed away in 1980 at the age of 83.

Partial filmography

The Knife (1918)
In the Hollow of Her Hand (1918) - (uncredited)
The Indestructible Wife (1919) - Toots Brooks
The World to Live In (1919) - Bride
The Firing Line (1919) - Cecile Cardross
The Copperhead (1920) - Madeline
The Path She Chose (1920) - Virginia
Everything but the Truth (1920) - Annabelle Elton
 The Girl in the Rain (1920) - Judith
La La Lucille (1920) - Lucille Smith
The Seventh Day (1922) - Betty Alden
Her Gilded Cage (1922) - Jacqueline Ornoff
To Have and to Hold  (1922) - Lady Jane Carr
Only 38 (1923) - Mary Hedley
Dulcy (1923) - Angela Forbes
The Gold Diggers (1923) - Violet Dayne
Arizona Express (1924) - Florence Brown
40-Horse Hawkins (1924) - Mary Darling
The Roughneck (1924) - Zelle
Introduce Me (1925) - Betty Perry
The Rainbow Trail (1925) - Fay Larkin
 The Wrongdoers (1925) - Helen Warren
Keep Smiling (1925) - Rose Ryan
The Splendid Crime (1925) - Beth Van Dyke
Under Western Skies (1926) - Ella Parkhurst
The Flaming Frontier (1926) - Betty Stanwood
 Racing Blood (1926) - Muriel Sterlinng
Eyes of the Totem (1927) - Betty Hardy
 The Heart of the Yukon (1927) - Anita Wayne
College  (1927) - The Girl
Men O' War (1929, Short) - Brunette
The Widow from Chicago (1930) - Mazie (uncredited)
True Confession (1937) - Alternate Juror (uncredited)
You Can't Take It with You (1938) - Miss Jones - Blakely's Secretary (uncredited)
Mr. Smith Goes To Washington (1939) - Senate Reporter (uncredited)
Triple Justice (1940) - Wedding Guest (uncredited)
The Climax (1944) - Minor Role (uncredited)
The Southerner (1945) - Townswoman (uncredited)
Don't Gamble with Strangers (1946) - Servant (uncredited)
Below the Deadline (1946) - Minor Role (uncredited)
They Won't Believe Me (1947) - Screaming Woman in Courtroom (uncredited)
Isn't It Romantic? (1948) - Townswoman (uncredited)
Knock on Any Door (1949) - Woman (uncredited)
The Miracle of Our Lady of Fatima (1952) - Lucia (uncredited)
Destry (1954) - Townswoman (uncredited)
Untamed (1955) - Pioneer Woman (uncredited)
The Search for Bridey Murphy (1956) - Mother (uncredited)
The Buster Keaton Story (1957) - Mrs. Jennings (uncredited)
The Wild and the Innocent (1959) - Bit Role (uncredited) (final film role)

References

External links

Anne Cornwall at Virtual History
Early Photo
Early Autographed Photo
Death Certificate
California Death Index

American silent film actresses
Actresses from New York City
People from Brooklyn
1897 births
1980 deaths
20th-century American actresses
WAMPAS Baby Stars